The Atlanta Hawks (formerly known as the Tri-Cities Blackhawks, the Milwaukee Hawks, and the St. Louis Hawks) have selected the following players in the National Basketball Association Draft.

Key

As Atlanta Hawks (1968–present)

As St. Louis Hawks (1955–1967)

As Milwaukee Hawks (1952–1954)

As Tri-Cities Blackhawks (1950–1951)

References
 Atlanta Hawks Draft Register at Basketball-Reference.com

 
National Basketball Association draft
Draft history